Isolated Mass/Circumflex (Number 2), stylized as Isolated Mass/Circumflex (#2), is an outdoor 1968–1978 sculpture by Michael Heizer, installed outside the Menil Collection in Houston, Texas, United States. The work is one of several by Heizer in the Menil Collection.

See also

 1978 in art
 List of public art in Houston

References

1978 establishments in Texas
1978 sculptures
Outdoor sculptures in Houston
Neartown, Houston